Mohamed Sijelmassi (1932, Kenitra – 17 October 2007, Casablanca) was a Moroccan writer and physician. He is the author of several books on art, Moroccan culture and islamic heritage.

Works (selection) 
1972: La Peinture marocaine
1974: Les Arts traditionnels
1975: La Mamounia, Marrakech
1985: Enfants du Maghreb entre hier et aujourd'hui
 Les Arts traditionnels au Maroc
 Enluminures des manuscrits royaux au Maroc
1998: L'Art contemporain au Maroc.
1991: Fès : Cité de l'art et du savoir, Courbevoie, ACR Édition
1993: Le Guide des parents
1996: L'Art calligraphique de l'Islam, (coauthor : Abdelkebir Khatibi)
1996: Civilisation marocaine, (coauthor: Abdelkébir Khatibi; translated into German, English and Italian)
1997: Mémoire du Maroc
1999: Le Désir du Maroc, Paris, Marval, (pref. Tahar Ben Jelloun)
2003: Les Arts traditionnels marocains 
2003: Casablanca que j'aime
2007: Maroc Méditerranée, de Tanger à Saidia

See also 
 List of Moroccan writers

References

External links 
 Biography of Mohamed Sijelmassi
 Bibliographie sur Amazon

Winners of the Prix Broquette-Gonin (literature)
People from Kenitra
Moroccan writers
Moroccan writers in French
1932 births
2007 deaths